Jan Lenica (4 January 1928, Poznań, Poland – 5 October 2001, Berlin) was a Polish graphic designer and cartoonist.

A graduate of the Architecture Department of Warsaw Polytechnic, Lenica became a poster illustrator and a collaborator on the early animation films of Walerian Borowczyk. From 1963 – 1986 he lived and worked in France, while from 1987 he lived and worked in Berlin. He was a professor of graphic, poster, animated cartoon for many years at German high schools and the first professor of the animation class at the University of Kassel, Germany, in 1979.  He used cut-out stop motion animation in his numerous films, which included two features: Adam 2 (1968) and Ubu et la grande gidouille (1976, but released in France only in 1979).

Major awards
1960 - Nominated for a BAFTA Film Award for Dom. Shared with Polish Walerian Borowczyk
1961 - Toulouse-Lautrec Grand Prix, Versailles (France)
1961 - Golden Dragon for Nowy Janko Muzykant tied with Mały Western, Cracow (Poland)
1962 - 1st and 3rd prizes, International Film Poster Exhibition, Karlove Vary (Czech Republic)
1963 - Annecy International Animated Film Festival / FIPRESCI Prize for Labirynt
1964 - Honorable Mention for Die Nashörner in Oberhausen International Short Film Festival (Germany)
1966 - Gold Medal Prix Max Ernst, International Poster Biennale, Warsaw (Poland)
1971 - Gold Medal, International Tourism Poster Exhibition, Catania (Italy)
1985 - Prix Jules Chéret (France)
1987 - Graphics award, Children Book Fair, Bologna (Italy)
1999 - Dragon of Dragons Honorary Awards in Cracow Film Festival (Poland)

Directions
Jan Lenica was the director of:
1957 - Nagrodzone uczucia (Love Requited)
1957 - Był sobie raz... (Once Upon a Time...)
1958 - Dom (House)
1961 - Italia '61
1961 - Nowy Janko Muzykant
1963 - Labirynt
1965 - La Femme Fleur
1965 - A
1970 - Adam 2
1987 - Ubu et la Grande Gidouille
2001 - Wyspa R.O.

See also
List of graphic designers
List of Polish painters
List of Polish graphic designers
Graphic design

References

Kempa, Karolina (2018), Polnische Kulturplakate im Sozialismus. Eine kunstsoziologische Untersuchung zur (Be-)Deutung des Werkes von Jan Lenica und Franciszek Starowieyski, Wiesbaden: Springer,

External links

Jan Lenica biography and filmography at culture.pl
Jan Lenica filmography (in French, but more accurate than IMDB)

Jan Lenica Posters
Animation in the Post-Industrial Era (mentions Jan Lenica's works)
Jan Lenica's Posters at ContemporaryPosters.com

1928 births
2001 deaths
Artists from Poznań
People from Poznań Voivodeship (1921–1939)
Polish graphic designers
Polish poster artists
Polish animated film directors
German animated film directors
German graphic designers
German poster artists
Stop motion animators
Animation educators
Film people from Poznań